Robert Charles "Bob" Tullius was born 7 December 1930 in Rochester, New York. He is best known as a race car driver and racing team owner.

Early years
Tullius considered a career in teaching after graduating from high school. He served a term in the US Air Force, and while there quarterbacked the Chanute Air Force base football team until a leg injury put an end to his playing.

Tullius took a job in sales with Kodak, first in Rochester and later at Alexander, Virginia.

In 1960 Tullius bought a Triumph TR3 for his wife. She rarely drove the car. Tullius took the TR3 to racing school himself, and won the graduation race.

In 1972 Tullius was in Bangkok visiting a friend when he was struck in the street by a chauffeur-driven car and injured.

Motorsports career 

Tullius' racing career began in earnest in 1961, when in his first four races he finished first or second, and won the points championship. For 1962 Tullius asked Triumph to provide him with a TR4 to race, promising to "beat the pants off [their] TR4s with [his] TR3" unless they did. Tullius and Ed Diehl built the proffered TR4 into a racer. Tullius placed second in the TR4 in its first race at Lime Rock, but on its next outing at Lake Garnett, the car was totaled. When Triumph refused to replace the car, Tullius and Diehl bought two more wrecked TR4s and built a replacement car using parts from all three.

The decision to pursue motorsports professionally was made in 1963. His supervisor at Kodak forced Tullius to choose between his day job and racing; Tullius opted for racing. He would soon become the principal driver for Triumph's North American Competition Director Kas Kastner. In 1963 he also appeared in his first 12 Hours of Sebring, and would go on to win six SCCA championship races in the factory TR4.

Group 44
In 1965 Tullius established his own racing team, named Group 44 Incorporated, to pursue his chosen vocation while supporting his family. Co-founders included mechanic Brian Fuerstenau and New York advertising executive Dick Gilmartin, both of whom were also racing drivers. Gilmartin left Group 44 in 1965.

In 1963 the three future founders were sitting in a motel in Sebring working on a name for their team. Gilmartin took a napkin and wrote "Group" on it for the three of them, the "44" was contributed by Tullius, and finally "Incorporated". Tullius originally asked the SCCA for permission to use the number 1 on his cars because it could be applied with a single line of tape, but was denied. "44" was also taken, so he began using "444", and dropped the third numeral later. At Lime Rock, Tullius' wife cut one of the numerals backwards and, lacking a sheet of contact paper to recut it, cut the second "4" in the same way, so that Tullius raced with a reversed "44". He continued to run cars with some numbers reversed after that.

Group 44 developed a three-pronged approach to their business. They raced their own cars, built racing cars for paying customers, and ran an extensive marketing and sponsoring department for vehicle manufacturers and racing teams. The company originally used white with black stripes, but changed the color scheme to include a green stripe when they arranged sponsorship from Quaker State motor oil, a division of Royal Dutch Shell. This sponsorship would last for several decades. The cars were not only well prepared, but immaculately presented. The team also used a unique articulated transporter painted in team colors to ferry their cars between races.

Group 44 is exclusively associated with vehicles from British Leyland, initially fielding Triumph TRs and Spitfires and later campaigning models from MG and Jaguar. When Group 44 entered two Jaguar XJR-5 cars in the 1984 24 Hours of Le Mans, it was the first time a Jaguar had raced at Le Mans in 27 years. When Group 44 cars traveled to an event their cars would be displayed at the local British Leyland dealers and the team would be promoted through local media. For a time almost all of British Leyland's marketing in the United States went through Group 44.

Group 44 continued to operate until 1990, only shutting down when the last of their sponsorship contracts expired. The team won 14 national SCCA championships and three Trans Am titles. Among the more than 300 race victories there are also eleven successes in IMSA GTP championship races.

Other racing
Tullius personally raced cars from a wide range of manufacturers, including Alpine, AMC, Chevrolet, Dodge, Oldsmobile, Pontiac, Plymouth, Porsche, Ferrari, and Ford.

At the inaugural Trans-Am Sedan Championship race on March 25, 1966 at Sebring, Tullius finished second overall and first in the Over 2.0 Litre class in a Dodge Dart. In the final years of Trans-Am Tullius drove Herb Adams' Gray Ghost Pontiac Tempest.

Tullius drove competitively until 1986, retiring after his final win at the 24 Hours of Daytona. He appeared in no fewer than 252 races, winning 38 and posting 43 class wins. In 1965 and 1975 he won the overall standings of the SCCA Championships and in 1977 and 1978, the overall ratings of the category I of the Trans Am Series. In the 1983 IMSA GTP series he finished in second place behind Al Holbert. Three times he was on the pole of the 24 Hours of Le Mans, where he also won the 1985 GTP class with a 13th-place finish. His best showing at Sebring was a fourth place in 1985.

Post-racing
Tullius bought the last TR6 and last TR8 built by British Leyland when production ended.

In 1969 he developed an interest in aviation which he continued to pursue after retiring from racing. He became a World War II airplane enthusiast, and participated in several Warbird Air Shows. He also took part in the Young Eagles program operated by the Experimental Aircraft Association (EAA).

His personal hangar in Sebring, Florida held several of his own aircraft. Among them were a North American T-6 Texan, a Fairchild PT-26A, a Waco ZPF-6 biplane and a Beechcraft King Air twin in which he had logged several thousand hours of pilot-in-command time. Tullius also owned a Mustang P-51D, which he donated to the Royal Air Force Museum. Other planes reported to be in the hangar were a Stearman and a North American T-28 Trojan. Sharing space in the hangar with the planes were also a selection of original Group 44 cars.

Honors
 Tullius was inducted into the Sebring Hall of Fame in 2014.
 He became a member of the SCCA Hall of Fame in 2015.
 He entered the British Sports Car Hall of Fame in 2017.
 In 2018, he was inducted into the Motorsports Hall of Fame of America.

Racing record

Le Mans results

Sebring results

World Sportscar Championship results

References

Further reading

External links 

 
 
 
 

American racing drivers
24 Hours of Le Mans drivers
12 Hours of Sebring drivers
IMSA GTP Championship drivers
1930s births
Living people
Jaguar Racing drivers
Sports car racing team owners